Floriana Lima (born March 26, 1981) is an American actress and model. She played Maggie Sawyer on The CW's Supergirl. She began playing recurring character Darcy Cooper in season 2 of the ABC drama A Million Little Things, and was promoted to the main cast for season 3.

Early life
Floriana was born in Cincinnati, Ohio, the daughter of Dennis Lima and Angela Maynard. She is of Italian, Irish, English, Spanish and Portuguese descent. She graduated from Fairfield Senior High School in 1999 and went on to study Communications at Ohio State University.

After college, she worked as a production assistant at NBC affiliate WCMH-TV in Columbus, Ohio. She then decided to move to Los Angeles to pursue an acting career.

Career
Lima was a series regular in the internet comedy Poor Paul (2008-2009) and later became a series regular in Fox's medical drama The Mob Doctor (2012-2013). She had a recurring role in NBC's spy series Allegiance (2015), was a series regular in ABC's thriller The Family (2016) and had a recurring role in Fox's action drama Lethal Weapon from 2016 to 2018. From 2016-2017, Lima played lesbian Detective Maggie Sawyer in season two & three of The CW's Supergirl.

In 2018, Lima played the character of psychiatrist Krista Dumont in the second season of Netflix's The Punisher.

In 2019, Lima joined the second season of ABC's A Million Little Things as military veteran and physical therapist Darcy Cooper. She became a series regular in season 3 (2021).

Lima made one-off appearances in episodes of How I Met Your Mother (2008), Ghost Whisperer (2009), Melrose Place (2009), House (2010), In Plain Sight (2010), Franklin & Bash (2011), Psych (2014), and CSI: Crime Scene Investigation (2014).

Filmography

References

External links

1981 births
Living people
Actresses from Cincinnati
American people of Irish descent
American people of Italian descent
American people of Portuguese descent
American people of Spanish descent
American television actresses
American models
21st-century American actresses
Ohio State University School of Communication alumni